The 1978–79 John Player Cup was the eighth edition of England's premier rugby union club competition at the time. Leicester won the competition defeating Moseley in the final. The event was sponsored by John Player cigarettes and the final was held at Twickenham Stadium.

Draw and results

First round
				
Progressed as away team*

Second round

Quarter-finals

Semi-finals

Final

References

1978–79 rugby union tournaments for clubs
1978–79 in English rugby union
RFU Knockout Cup